In functional analysis, the open mapping theorem, also known as the Banach–Schauder theorem or the Banach theorem (named after Stefan Banach and Juliusz Schauder), is a fundamental result which states that if a bounded or continuous linear operator between Banach spaces is surjective then it is an open map.

Classical (Banach space) form

Suppose  is a surjective continuous linear operator.

Let 
Then

Since  is surjective:

But  is Banach so by Baire's category theorem

That is, we have  and  such that

Let  then

By continuity of addition and linearity, the difference  satisfies

and by linearity again,

where we have set 
It follows that for all  and all  there exists some  such that

Our next goal is to show that 

Let 
Define a sequence  inductively as follows.
Assume:

Then by (1) we can pick  so that:

so (2) is satisfied for  Let

From the first inequality in (2), is a Cauchy sequence, and since  is complete,  converges to some 
Also,

This shows that  belongs to  so  as claimed.
Thus the image  of the unit ball in  contains the open ball  of 

Related results

Consequences

The open mapping theorem has several important consequences:
 If  is a bijective continuous linear operator between the Banach spaces  and  then the inverse operator  is continuous as well (this is called the bounded inverse theorem).

Generalizations

Furthermore, the theorem can be combined with the Baire category theorem in the following manner:

The quotient mapping  is open, and the mapping  is an isomorphism of topological vector spaces.

The open mapping theorem can also be stated as

Nearly/Almost open linear maps

A bijective linear map is nearly open if and only if its inverse is continuous.
Every surjective linear map from locally convex TVS onto a barrelled TVS is nearly open. The same is true of every surjective linear map from a TVS onto a Baire TVS.

Consequences

Webbed spaces

Webbed spaces are a class of topological vector spaces for which the open mapping theorem and the closed graph theorem hold.

See also

References

Bibliography
  
  
  
  
  
 
  
  
  
  
  
  
  
  
  
  
  
  

Articles containing proofs
Theorems in functional analysis